Indomilk Arena (formerly Benteng Taruna Stadium) is a multi-purpose stadium in Kelapa Dua, Tangerang Regency, Banten, Indonesia. It is used as the home venue for Persita Tangerang and Dewa United F.C. of Liga Indonesia.  The stadium is designed for a capacity of 30,000. The construction started in 2014 and finished in 2018. The stadium is the main arena of Tangerang Kelapa Dua Sport Center, which consists of this stadium, a sport center/gymnasium, a wall for climbing, a softball and baseball field.

References

External links
 Stadium information

Tangerang Regency
Football venues in Indonesia
Athletics (track and field) venues in Indonesia
Buildings and structures in Banten
Sport in Banten
Sports venues in Banten